A Ratusz (Ratusha) is a historic administrative building in countries that adopted the Magdeburg rights such as the Holy Roman Empire, Polish–Lithuanian Commonwealth and others. It was distinguished with a bell tower (lookout or a clock tower). Unlike a regular city hall which may or may not have any specific architectural compositions, ratusz (rathaus) always consisted of a building with a tower.

Ratusz was primarily designated as a city hall, traditionally built in the centre of a town or in the middle of a town square or more common market square (freedom of trade as the main goal of Magdeburg rights). Although the old ratusz can still maintain the function of a seat of local government, frequently it is separated from the contemporary city government, the administrative building housing the town council, and often serves as a museum of local history (for example in Ivano-Frankivsk and Tarnów among many others).

History
Prominent examples of a historic ratusz can be found in at least 82 Polish cities. Some of them date back to the mid-13th century, like the ratusz in Kalisz. The oldest tower still standing was erected in 1274 in Toruń while the actual building with 365 windows comes from the 14th century. The ratusz in Zamość, built during the Renaissance in Poland, is one of the highest achievements of Renaissance architecture anywhere in the country. It was intentionally placed in the corner of the town square not to outshine the nearby Zamoyski Palace of the city's owners, which it did anyway, once the imposing Baroque staircase was added in the 17th century.  The ratusz in Poznań, dating from the mid-16th century, has a clock with billy goats butting heads, which attracts hundreds of spectators every day in tourist season. Throughout the centuries many Polish town halls have been damaged in foreign invasions, such as the ratusz in Sandomierz, with city rights since 1286, meticulously renovated before being turned into a museum. In the royal city of Kraków, the historic ratusz, built of brick and mortar in the centre of Main Square, originally in 1316, has been torn down not by the occupiers, but by the Cracovians themselves in 1820 because it was not considered pretty enough. What remains of it is the massive town-hall tower, a prominent example of Polish Gothic architecture.

A considerable number of heritage city halls became historical museums in the 20th century, including the ratusz in Toruń (Toruń Regional Museum or Muzeum Okręgowe in Polish), with stained glass and gingerbread divisions, in Poznań (Muzeum Okręgowe), with a Chopin division, in Lublin (Muzeum Okręgowe), Siedlce (Muzeum Okręgowe), Białystok (Muzeum Podlaskie), Gdańsk (Muzeum Historii Miasta), Sandomierz (Muzeum Okręgowe), and Szczecin (Muzeum Historii Miasta Szczecina). Others still serve as seats of local government, and sometimes also as civil wedding halls and art galleries, restaurants, and cultural centres. These include Zamość, Kielce, Zielona Góra (also a civil wedding hall, restaurant, and winery), Kętrzyn (also a wedding hall and cultural centre), and Kołobrzeg (also a wedding hall, cultural centre, and gallery of modern art).

Etymology
The Polish word ratusz to describe a city hall is derived from the German Rathaus (council house) sometime during the Middle Ages. The influence also serves as a metonym for the burmistrz (burgomaster, or mayor), derived from the German bürgermeister.

Since 1980, the Polish Tourist and Sightseeing Society (PTTK) offers a badge for tourists interested in organizing group excursions across the country with the aim of visiting the maximum number of ratusz towns and cities. The PTTK hands out a special booklet where stamps can be collected for the gold badge awarded for visiting a minimum of twenty ratusz outlets.

Prominent examples

References

 
 
Polish words and phrases
Gubernatorial titles
Architecture in Poland
Magdeburg rights